Dr Shanti Swarup Bhatnagar University Institute of Chemical Engineering and Technology, Panjab University (formerly known as Department of Chemical Engineering and Technology) is a Department of the state-funded Panjab University, Chandigarh.

Courses offered
SSBUICET conducts a number of courses. Apart from Chemical Engineering there are other streams related to Chemical Engineering like Food Technology and Industrial Chemistry are also taught at the department. The department grants the following degrees:
 Bachelor of Engineering, Chemical Engineering
 Bachelor of Engineering, Food Technology
 Bachelor of Engineering, Chemical Engineering with MBA

 MSc Industrial Chemistry
 Master of Engineering, Chemical Engineering
 Master of Engineering (Chemical with specialization in Environmental Engineering)
 Master of Engineering (Food Technology)
 Master of Technology (Polymer)
 Doctoral Programme in Chemical Engineering

See also
Education in India
Literacy in India
List of institutions of higher education in Punjab, India

References
 http://www.tribuneindia.com/2010/20100531/cth1.htm
 http://www.iiche.org.in/aic.php
 http://cet.puchd.ac.in/

External links
 http://uicet.puchd.ac.in

Panjab University
Universities in Chandigarh
Engineering colleges in Punjab, India
Engineering colleges in Chandigarh
All India Council for Technical Education
Chemical industry of India
Educational institutions established in 1958
1958 establishments in Chandigarh